Cochlodina laminata is a species of air-breathing land snail, a terrestrial pulmonate gastropod mollusk in the family Clausiliidae, the door snails, all of which have a clausilium.

Subspecies
 Cochlodina laminata albanica S. H. F. Jaeckel, 1956
 Cochlodina laminata grossa (Rossmässler, 1835)
 Cochlodina laminata insulana E. Gittenberger, 1967
 Cochlodina laminata laminata (Montagu, 1803)
 Cochlodina laminata nana (Möllendorff, 1873)
 Cochlodina laminata oreinos (A. J. Wagner, 1914)
 Cochlodina laminata partita (Westerlund, 1892)

Distribution
This species occurs in much of Europe, including:
 The Czech Republic
 Bulgaria
 Netherlands
 Poland
 Slovakia
 Ukraine
 Ireland
 Great Britain

Description
Like all species in the family Clausiliidae, Cochlodina laminata has a clausilium or "door". The second image shows the shape of the clausilium in this species.

The shell is brown to cherry red, nearly smooth and shiny. The parietalis is small, the columellaris is more prominent, the palatal callus is weak, the subcolumellaris is visible in an oblique view. .

The weight of the adult live snail is about 138±5 mg.

References

 Sysoev, A. V. & Schileyko, A. A. (2009). Land snails and slugs of Russia and adjacent countries. Sofia/Moskva (Pensoft). 312 pp., 142 plates

External links 
 Montagu, G. (1803). Testacea Britannica or natural history of British shells, marine, land, and fresh-water, including the most minute: Systematically arranged and embellished with figures. J. White, London, Vol. 1, xxxvii + 291 pp;; Vol. 2, pp. 293–606, pl. 1-16
Cochlodina laminata at Animalbase taxonomy,short description (including diagnosis), distribution, biology,status (threats), images

Clausiliidae
Molluscs of Europe
Gastropods described in 1803
Taxa named by George Montagu (naturalist)